Robert Bent (c. 1745 – 1832), of 46 Portugal Street, Lincoln's Inn Fields, Middlesex and West Molesey, Surrey, was an English politician.

He was a member of parliament for Aylesbury 1802 to 29 February 1804. He was unseated for petition on the grounds of bribery.

Bent and his wife had two sons- Jeffery Hart Bent and Ellis Bent, both judges- and three daughters.

References

1745 births
1832 deaths
People from the London Borough of Camden
People from Molesey
Members of the Parliament of the United Kingdom for English constituencies
UK MPs 1802–1806